NGC 131 is a spiral galaxy that was discovered on September 25, 1834, by John Herschel. This galaxy belongs in the NGC 134 group of galaxies: NGC 115, NGC 148, NGC 150, PGC 2000 (often confused with IC 1554), IC 1555, and PGC 2044.

Appearance 
John Herschel described the galaxy as "faint, pretty large, pretty much extended, very gradually brighter middle."

References

External links 
 

0131
Sculptor (constellation)
Astronomical objects discovered in 1834
Spiral galaxies